Akil Anthony Borneo (born 18 April 1979), better known by his stage name 5Star Akil, is a Trinidadian Soca artist and disc jockey (DJ). Born in St James, a suburb in Trinidad and Tobago which locals have dubbed "the city that never sleeps", Borneo began his career in music at the age of sixteen as a DJ, playing live music at Club Prosperity in
his neighbourhood. He, along with friends, eventually formed one of the most successful DJ outfits
in Trinidad and Tobago, Associate Degree Sound System before receiving his breakthrough in radio as an on-air personality at 96.1wefm, one of Trinidad and Tobago's leading urban radio stations.
 
At the heights of his DJ career, Akil survived being shot five times, before moving on to become one of the Caribbean's most consistent Soca artists 

In 2012, 5Star Akil released his first major Soca single Partier, which was followed by another hit release in 2014, To Meh Heart 

5Star Akil created history in Trinidad and Tobago in 2016 when his single, Different Me
(written by Jovan James and produced by Nikholai Greene) gave steelpan champs Desperadoes Steel Orchestra, its 11th National Panorama title  after not winning a championship for 16 years.

In 2017 5Star Akil released his debut mix tape HERO.

References

External links

Trinidad and Tobago musicians
Soca musicians
Living people
1979 births
Place of birth missing (living people)